George Noakes  (13 September 1924 – 14 July 2008) was the Bishop of St Davids and the Archbishop of Wales.

Born in Ceredigion on 13 September 1924 and educated at the University of Aberystwyth, after wartime service in the RAFVR he was ordained in 1950. After a curacy at Lampeter he was successively Vicar of Eglwyswrw, Tregaron, Eglwys Dewi Sant (a Welsh language church in Cardiff), Aberystwyth; and finally, before his elevation to the episcopate, Archdeacon of Cardigan. He died on 14 July 2008, aged 83.

References

1924 births
2008 deaths
Welsh military personnel
Royal Air Force airmen
People from Ceredigion
Alumni of Aberystwyth University
Royal Air Force Volunteer Reserve personnel of World War II
Archdeacons of Cardigan
Bishops of St Davids
Archbishops of Wales
20th-century Anglican archbishops
Welsh-speaking clergy
20th-century bishops of the Church in Wales